The 109th United States Congress began on January 3, 2005. There were nine new senators (two Democrats, seven Republicans) and 40 new representatives (16 Democrats, 24 Republicans) at the start of its first session. Additionally, one senator (a Democrat) and six representatives (two Democrats, four Republicans) took office on various dates in order to fill vacancies during the 109th Congress before it ended on January 3, 2007.

Senate

Took office January 3, 2005

Took office during the 109th Congress

House of Representatives

Took office January 3, 2005

Non-voting members

Took office during the 109th Congress

See also 
List of United States senators in the 109th Congress
List of members of the United States House of Representatives in the 109th Congress by seniority

109th United States Congress
109